Team Ghost is a French electronic music group created by Nicolas Fromageau, co-founder of M83, which he left in 2004.

History 

In Paris with the help of Jean-Philippe Talaga (who is the band A&R today) and bandmate Christophe Guérin, Nicolas Fromageau founded Team Ghost in 2007. the band released their first EP in April 2010 First act to be coined as “cold gaze” by the NME (for their mixture of Cold Wave and Shoegaze), Team Ghost released the EP "You Never Did Anything Wrong to Me", in 2010 through the English label Sonic Cathedral. In the fall of that year, they followed it with the EP "Celebrate What You Can't See" produced by Villeneuve. This collaboration resulted in Benoît de Villeneuve to join the band as composer together with bassist Pierre Blanc and drummer Félix Delacroix.

After a series of concerts given in Paris, the group was the opening act of the European tour for the Canadians Crystal Castles. Team Ghost has also played at several festivals in the United Kingdom during the summer of 2010 such as the Offset Festival of London and the festival Rockness in Scotland. The two first EPs were released as "We Will Shine" in Japan at the fall of 2011 

Team Ghost released their first album Rituals in March 2013 and the first single is called "Dead Film Star". They went on tour in April 2013 in Europe  and in New York on June.

On December 2, 2016 they released their third, self titled and self released album, preceded by the single "The Riser".

Band members 

Nicolas Fromageau: vocals, guitar
Christophe Guérin: vocals, guitar
Benoit de Villeneuve : vocals, guitar, keyboard
Félix Delacroix: drums
Pierre Blanc: bass

Discography

Albums 
2011: We All Shine (Sonic Cathedral)
2013: Rituals (wSphere)
2016: Team Ghost (self released, distributed by Grand Musique)

Singles 

2016: The Riser (self released, distributed by Grand Musique)  [Listen]

EP 

 2010 : You Never Did Anything Wrong To Me (Sonic Cathedral)
 2010 : Celebrate What You Can't See (Sonic Cathedral)
 2012 : Dead Film Star (wSphere / Wagram)
 2013 : Curtains (wSphere)
 2013 : Terre Brûlée (wSphere) (Record Store Day)

Remixes 
 2010 : Yeti lane - Twice
 2010 : Wild Palms - To The Lighthouse
 2011 : M83 - Midnight City
 2011 : Anoraak feat. Siobhan Wilson – Dolphins & Highways
 2012 : Fairewell - Wild Meadow / I've Been Locked Away
 2012 : Collateral - CTRL 5
 2012 : Villeneuve – The Sun
 2012 : Unkle – Natural Selection
 2012 : Mandrac – Magnet
 2013 : Benjamin Biolay - Profite (feat. Vanessa Paradis)
 2013 : Owlle – Ticky Ticky

References

External links 
 

French electronic music groups
Musical groups from Paris